

David Harvey Crewe (20 October 1941 –  17 June 1970) and Jeannette Lenore Crewe (née Demler; 6 February 1940 –  17 June 1970) were a New Zealand farming couple who were shot to death in their home around 17 June 1970. The murders led to the wrongful conviction and subsequent pardoning of another farmer who lived nearby, Arthur Allan Thomas. A Royal Commission set up to investigate the miscarriage of justice found that a detective had fabricated evidence and placed it at the scene of the crime. No person was ever charged with planting the evidence, and the murders remain unsolved.

Background
Jeannette Crewe's father, Lenard M. Demler, was fined £10,000 for tax evasion in 1962, and had been forced to sell a half share in his farm to his wife in order to meet the liability. Jeanette married her husband, David Harvey Crewe (known as Harvey), in Auckland in 1966.

In 1970, the Crewes and their 18-month-old daughter lived on their farm at Pukekawa, Lower Waikato. Jeannette was afraid to be in the house without her husband after bizarre burglary and arson attacks, including one in which clothes were set on fire in a bedroom. At the time of her death, Jeannette was about to receive her mother's half-share in the Demler farm, which adjoined that of the Crewes. The bequest to Jeannette had come about after Jeannette's sister had been cut from their mother's will, and Demler had removed Jeannette as a beneficiary of his own will in retaliation although she had no role in the original matter. Jeannette's mother had then re-written her will to bequeath to Jeannette the half-share in Demler's farm that he lived on.

Crime
Harvey (28), and Jeannette (30), were found to be missing from their bloodstained farmhouse on 22 June 1970 by Demler (died 4 November 1992), who had been asked to look in on them by an alarmed neighbour because they had not answered the telephone for days. The Crewes' 18-month-old daughter Rochelle was distraught in her cot. Demler left her alone while he went on a farm errand. The Crewes had last been seen on 17 June, and milk, bread, and newspaper deliveries on the morning of 18 June had not been collected from the letterbox.

No medical opinion that an infant could survive without fluids for five days is supported by any verified case of such an occurrence. Although Rochelle had tissue loss, suggesting she had eaten little or nothing between 17 and 22 June, the degree to which she retained water during treatment indicated that she had not ingested fluids for at most 48 hours before she was found. A witness later reported that he had seen a woman unknown to him on the property on 19 June. Demler was the leading suspect due to his propinquity and failure to raise the alarm until prompted, apparent guilty knowledge that Rochelle did not require immediate medical attention, blood of Jeannette's type on his car seat, and a scratch on his neck. Police were also told that Demler probably had access to an unregistered .22 calibre weapon. Demler's behaviour continued to raise suspicion; during police searches of the countryside for the Crewes, he shadowed on horseback without helping, and presciently suggested they would be found in water. However, the evidence against Demler was entirely circumstantial and he strongly denied any knowledge of what had happened to his daughter and her husband. He was also said to have an alibi for one of the arson incidents as he had been attending dinner with the Crewes when a fire was discovered.

Jeannette's body was found on 16 August, wrapped in a duvet bound with copper wire, in the Waikato River and her husband's body was retrieved upriver on 16 September. A car axle linked to a neighbouring farmer, Arthur Allan Thomas, had apparently been used to weigh down Harvey's body and was central to police theories about the case, although it did not justify a prosecution.

Investigation and trials
Both victims had been shot to death with a .22 calibre firearm; Jeannette had broken facial bones from being struck with a blunt instrument. Demler had been considered the main suspect, but the brutality of the assault on Jeannette, and the lead investigator's belief that she had been raped, led to doubts that he was involved. On the basis that the murderer might have used a legitimately held gun, police collected and test fired sixty-four registered .22 firearms, 3% of the total recorded as held in the Pukekawa area. A forensic report on 19 August stated that, of the sixty-four, neither Thomas' rifle nor one owned by the Eyre family could be eliminated as the possible murder weapon, but there was insufficient evidence pointing to one or the other. Although police suggested to Thomas during an interview that his rifle was used to kill the Crewes, the gun was returned to him on 8 September. On 27 October, the garden at the Crewe house was searched for a third time and a spent cartridge case was found, apparently still lying where the murderer had left it. The case carried marks which showed that it had been ejected from Thomas' rifle. In November, Thomas was arrested and charged.

Despite his wife and cousin giving him a strong alibi for 17 June, Thomas was sent for trial on a charge of murdering the Crewes. The prosecution suggested Thomas's wife, Vivien, had been the woman seen at the Crewes' house, although she was not charged. The witness was certain Vivien Thomas, whom he knew, was not the woman whom he saw. The prosecution said that the motive for the murders was that Thomas had been obsessed with Jeannette, an accusation for which they provided very little evidence. A witness who did give testimony supporting the prosecution's contention that Jeannette had been pestered by Thomas was Demler; he was cross-examined about why he had not mentioned such obviously relevant information before the court had begun sitting. Thomas was found guilty of the murders in a 1971 trial, but the conviction was overturned on appeal. He was tried again in 1973 and convicted. Supporters of Thomas started a campaign to bring to public attention that the key evidence against him had serious anomalies.

Campaign, pardon and Royal Commission
A campaign, led in part by Pat Booth of the Auckland Star, was largely responsible for getting Thomas released with a pardon. Campaigners said forensic work by Dr Jim Sprott had shown that the cartridge case had been planted at the scene and that its method of construction identified it as being from a batch that could not have contained the number 8 bullets recovered from the victims. Following David Yallop's book about the case, Beyond Reasonable Doubt, Thomas was pardoned by Governor-General Keith Holyoake on the recommendation of Prime Minister Robert Muldoon. Thomas was released after serving nine years in prison. He was paid NZ$950,000 compensation for his time in jail and loss of the use of his farm.

A Royal Commission of Inquiry was ordered to review the wrongful conviction of Thomas and reported to the Governor-General in November 1980. The Commissioners found that the spent cartridge case from Thomas's gun, Exhibit 350, had not been left by the murderer, but had been created weeks later by police using his impounded gun and ammunition, then planted at the Crewe farmhouse. The Commission's report implicated Detective Inspector Bruce Hutton and Detective Sergeant Lenrick Johnston in police misconduct, and found that the prosecution of Thomas for the murders had been unjustified. Despite the Commission describing the conduct of Hutton and Johnston as an "unspeakable outrage", the New Zealand Police never laid charges against any officer involved in the investigation and prosecution of Thomas. Johnston died in 1978. Hutton died in 2013. The case was made into the docu-drama feature film Beyond Reasonable Doubt in 1980.

Status of the case
In 2014 an official police review of the investigation into the homicides, at a cost of $400,000 to New Zealand taxpayers, said that evidence available in the murder of the Crewes was insufficient for any new prosecution. The review acknowledged that a key prosecution exhibit in the trials had been fabricated by detectives, but did not appear to accept that they could have been on the wrong track; the review implied that the Crewes' daughter had not ingested any fluids between 17 and 22 June, and said a witness had been mistaken in thinking he had seen a woman on the farm during that period. The review did however rule out Demler having been the killer. Rochelle Crewe expressed satisfaction that a police review of evidence had cleared her deceased grandfather of involvement in the murders. The case remains unsolved.

See also
 Crime in New Zealand
 Death of Scott Guy
 List of solved missing person cases
 List of unsolved murders
 The Eyre Murder

References

Further reading

External links
 Article by Pat Booth in the New Zealand Listener
 Report urging Police to reopen the case in 2006 Based on Chris Birt's investigation into the identity of the unknown woman.
 Interview with Investigative journalist Pat Booth – 40 years since the Crewe Murders
 'Who Killed the Crewes?', The Investigator Special, 2012, Bryan Bruce, TVNZ On Demand

1970s missing person cases
1970 murders in New Zealand
Deaths by firearm in New Zealand
Formerly missing people
History of Waikato
June 1970 events in New Zealand
Missing person cases in New Zealand
Unsolved murders in New Zealand